Marc Polmans was the defending champion but chose not to participate.

Tomáš Macháč won the title after defeating Bjorn Fratangelo 7–6(7–2), 6–3 in the final.

Seeds
All seeds receive a bye into the second round.

Draw

Finals

Top half

Section 1

Section 2

Bottom half

Section 3

Section 4

References

External links
Main draw
Qualifying draw

Traralgon International - 1